Legendary Tales is the debut studio album by the symphonic power metal band Rhapsody. It was released in 1997 on Limb Music. The album is the beginning of the Emerald Sword Saga.

Track listing

Personnel

Band members
Fabio Lione - vocals
Luca Turilli - guitars
Alex Staropoli - keyboards
Daniele Carbonera - drums

Guest musicians
Sascha Paeth - bass, acoustic guitars, mandolin 
Robert Hunecke - bass
Manuel Staropoli - baroque recorder 
Thomas Rettke, Cinzia Rizzo - backing vocals 
Thomas Rettke, Robert Hunecke, Miro, Wolfgang Herbst, Rick Rizzo, Fabio Lione, Luca Turilli, Alex Staropoli, Cinzia Rizzo, Tatiana Bloch - Choir of Immortals 
Anne Schnyder - lead violin 
Anne Schnyder & Helia Davis - violins 
Oliver Kopf - viola 
Paul F. Boehnke - cello 
Andre Neygenfind - contra bass

Production
Produced by Sascha Paeth and Miro
Engineered and mixed by Sascha Paeth and Miro at Gate-Studio in Wolfsburg, Germany.
Cover art and logo design: Eric Philippe
Photography: Karsten Koch, Hannover

References

1997 debut albums
Rhapsody of Fire albums
Limb Music albums